Picture card may refer to:

 Flash memory card for a digital camera 
 Picture card (cards) which has a picture on it (usually Jack, Queen or King, but sometimes including Ace or Joker)
 Trade card
 xD-Picture Card